The Ambassador of Australia to Afghanistan is an officer of the Australian Department of Foreign Affairs and Trade and the head of the Embassy of the Commonwealth of Australia to the Islamic Emirate of Afghanistan. 

On 28 May 2021 the embassy was closed, immediately prior to the fall of the Islamic Republic of Afghanistan, and the office of ambassador became vacant with the Taliban capture of Kabul on 15 August 2021. Since the embassy's closure and the fall of the Islamic Republic of Afghanistan, the Australian Interim Mission on Afghanistan in Doha, Qatar, headed by a Special Representative since September 2021, has the primary responsibility for Australia's position on and relations with Afghanistan.

Posting history
The establishment of diplomatic relations between Australia and the Kingdom of Afghanistan was announced on 16 December 1968 by the Minister for External Affairs, Paul Hasluck, with the High Commissioner to Pakistan based in Islamabad receiving non-resident accreditation. The first Australian Ambassador to Afghanistan, Lew Border, formally presented his credentials to King Zahir Shah on 30 March 1969. With the assumption of power of Babrak Karmal in Afghanistan following the murder of Hafizullah Amin on 27 December 1979, which marked the beginning of the Soviet–Afghan War, the Australian Government of Malcolm Fraser did not recognise Karmal's new government and diplomatic relations were suspended, with informal connections maintained by the High Commission in Islamabad. With the collapse of the Democratic Republic of Afghanistan in 1992, an agreement was struck between the two countries for the re-establishment of relations at the consular level on 16 April 1993, with an Afghan Honorary Consul, Mahmoud Saikal, appointed to Canberra on 29 September 1994, but relations at the ambassador level remained suspended.

Australia and Afghanistan re-established diplomatic representation in 2002, after a long hiatus during conflict in Afghanistan. Between April 2002 and September 2006, Australia's High Commissioner to Pakistan was accredited as non-resident Ambassador to Afghanistan. The first resident Australian Ambassador to Kabul was appointed in 2006, with the embassy initially located within the United States Embassy, then later the Serena Hotel. In November 2011, Prime Minister Julia Gillard formally opened a new dedicated embassy in the city.

On 28 May 2021 the embassy was closed, immediately prior to the fall of the Islamic Republic of Afghanistan with the Taliban capture of Kabul on 15 August 2021. The office of ambassador fell vacant following the fall of Kabul on 15 August 2021 and relations with Afghanistan were suspended. In September 2021, the Australian Interim Mission on Afghanistan was established in Doha, Qatar, headed by a Special Representative. The first Special Representative appointed was career diplomat, Daniel Sloper, who was the special envoy and head of the Australian crisis response team assisting in the evacuation of Kabul prior to and following its fall to Taliban forces on 15 August 2021.

Heads of mission

Ambassadors

Special Representatives

See also
List of ambassadors of Afghanistan to Australia
Embassy of Afghanistan, Canberra

References

External links

Australia’s Interim Mission to Afghanistan

 
Afghanistan
Australia